Coningham may refer to:

People
 Arthur Coningham (cricketer) (1863–1939), Australian cricketer
 Arthur Coningham (RAF officer) (1895–1948?), Royal Air Force air marshal
 Robin Coningham (born 1965), British archaeologist and academic
 William Coningham (1815–1884), British Liberal politician and art collector

Places
 Coningham Nature Recreation Area, a Protected areas of Tasmania, Australia
 Coningham, Tasmania, a locality in Australia

See also
 Conyngham (disambiguation)